Phoxim is an organophosphate insecticide that is produced by the Bayer corporation.  It is an analogous dimethyl ester and an organothiophosphate acaricide.  It is allowed for use in limited applications in the European Union. It is banned for use on crops in the European Union since 22 December 2007.

It is used in veterinary medicine to treat ectoparasitic acarids.

This pesticide should be used with caution since some insects like Helicoverpa assulta become even more resistant when exposed.

References

External links 

Acetylcholinesterase inhibitors
Organophosphate insecticides
Nitriles
Organothiophosphate esters
Oxime esters
Ethyl esters